La Verdadera victoria (English language:Passionately) is a 1944 Argentine romantic comedy film directed by Carlos F. Borcosque and starring Pedro López Lagar. Music by Franz Schubert was used in the film together with compositions by Alejandro Gutiérrez del Barrio.

Cast
Roberto Airaldi
Nélida Bilbao
Carlos Castro
Enrique Chaico
Pedro López Lagar
José Maurer...  Fisher

References

External links
 

1944 films
1940s Spanish-language films
Argentine black-and-white films
Films directed by Carlos F. Borcosque
Argentine romantic comedy films
1944 romantic comedy films
1940s Argentine films